Preseli Pembrokeshire  may refer to:

Preseli Pembrokeshire, a district in Wales, 1974-1996
Preseli Pembrokeshire (UK Parliament constituency), a constituency of the House of Commons of the Parliament of the United Kingdom
Preseli Pembrokeshire (Senedd constituency), a constituency of the Senedd